Peristeria guttata is a species of orchid native to the Neotropics.

References

External links 

guttata